Lohawat is a Block and village of Jodhpur district in Rajasthan, India. It became Lohawat (Rajasthan Assembly constituency) seat in 2008.

References

Villages in Jodhpur district